Navbharat Times (NBT)  a Hindi newspaper distributed in Delhi, Mumbai,  Lucknow and Kanpur. It is from the stable of Bennett, Coleman & Co. Ltd (BCCL), which also publishes other dailies including The Times of India, The Economic Times, Maharashtra Times and also magazines such as Filmfare and Femina. NBT is one of the oldest product of the BCCL group.

See also

The Times of India
The Economic Times
Maharashtra Times
List of newspapers in India by circulation
List of newspapers in the world by circulation
ET Now
Times Now

References

External links
 

Hindi-language newspapers
Newspapers published in Mumbai
Daily newspapers published in India
Publications with year of establishment missing
Publications of The Times Group
1946 establishments in India
Newspapers established in 1946